Central Bougainville District is a district of the Autonomous Region of Bougainville of Papua New Guinea.  Its capital is Arawa-Kieta.

References

Districts of Papua New Guinea
Autonomous Region of Bougainville